The risk-return ratio is a measure of return in terms of risk for a specific time period. The percentage return (R) for the time period is measured in a straightforward way:

where  and  simply refer to the price by the start and end of the time period.

The risk is measured as the percentage maximum drawdown (MDD) for the specific period:

where DDt, DDt-1, Pt and Pt-1 refer the drawdown (DD) and prices (P) at a specific point in time, t, or the time right before that, t-1.

The risk-return ratio is then defined and measured, for a specific time period, as:

Note that dividing a percentage numerator by a percentage denominator renders a single number. This RRR number is a measure of the return in terms of risk. It is fully comparable, i.e. it's possible to compare the RRR for one share with the RRR of another share, just as long as it's the same time period. 

The RRR as defined here is formally the same as the so-called MER ratio, and shares some similarities with the Calmar ratio, the Sterling ratio and the Burke ratio. However, the RRR can arguably be regarded as more general than the MER ratio since it can be used for any time interval even daily or intra-day prices, while the MER ratio seems to be confined to measuring only the risk and return of a fund since inception until the current date. It is also less ad hoc than the Calmar, the Sterling and the Burke ratios.

The RRR was first defined and popularized by Dr. Richard CB Johnsson in his investment newsletter ('A Simple Risk-Return-Ratio', July 25, 2010).

References

 Johnsson, Richard CB, A Simple Risk-Return-Ratio

Financial ratios
Investment indicators